Pavels Seļivanovs (born July 23, 1952) is a Latvian former volleyball player who competed for the Soviet Union in the 1976 Summer Olympics and in the 1980 Summer Olympics. In 1976, he was part of the Soviet team which won the silver medal in the Olympic tournament. He played all five matches. Four years later, in 1980, he won the gold medal with the Soviet team in the 1980 Olympic tournament. He played all six matches.

2 times world champion in 1978, 1982.
4 times European champion in 1975, 1977, 1979, 1983.
2 times World Cup winner.

References

External links
 

1952 births
Living people
Latvian men's volleyball players
Soviet men's volleyball players
Olympic volleyball players of the Soviet Union
Volleyball players at the 1976 Summer Olympics
Volleyball players at the 1980 Summer Olympics
Olympic gold medalists for the Soviet Union
Olympic silver medalists for the Soviet Union
Sportspeople from Riga
Olympic medalists in volleyball
Medalists at the 1980 Summer Olympics
Medalists at the 1976 Summer Olympics
Honoured Masters of Sport of the USSR
Competitors at the 1986 Goodwill Games
Goodwill Games medalists in volleyball
Latvian people of Russian descent